This is a list of civil parishes in the ceremonial county of the East Riding of Yorkshire, England. There are 172 civil parishes.

East Riding of Yorkshire
The former Bull Fort civil parish is the only unparished land in the East Riding of Yorkshire outside of Hull.

Kingston upon Hull

The former Kingston upon Hull County Borough is unparished.

See also
 List of civil parishes in England

References

External links
 Office for National Statistics : Geographical Area Listings
 East Riding of Yorkshire Council : Parishes

East Riding of Yorkshire
 
Civil parishes